2016 Roasso Kumamoto season.

J2 League

References

External links
 J.League official site

Roasso Kumamoto
Roasso Kumamoto seasons